The NATO Consultation, Command and Control Organization (NC3O) was formed in 1996. Its main objective is to provide a coherent, secure and interoperable C3 capability to the NATO.

The NATO Consultation, Command and Control Board (NATO C3 Board or NC3B), formed in 1996, acts as a Board of Directors for the NC3O and as its main policy body.

The NC3B meets every 6 months to review progress within the NC3O's two agencies, the NATO Consultation, Command and Control Agency (NC3A) and the NATO Communication and Information Systems Services Agency NCSA, previously known as NACOSA.  The NC3B is supported in its work by the staff within the NHQC3S and the sub-committees.

There are two main parts within the structure supporting NC3O which are on one side the Sub-Committees and, on the other side, the Agencies and support bodies.

The Subcommittees are divided depending on their roles going from the more policy oriented (i.e. SC/1) to the more technically oriented (i.e. SC/7).
Every Subcommittee is divided into Working Groups (WGs) or Ad Hoc Working Groups (AHWGs) and every Working Group is divided into Syndicates. When needed, a Subcommittee can create a Syndicate depending directly from itself.

Structure 
 NATO C3 Board
 Agencies and support bodies
 NC3REPS (National representatives within the NC3O)
 NC3A
 NATO CIS Services Agency (NCSA)
 NATO C3 Staff
 NATO PKI Management Authority
 NATO PKI Advisory Cell
 Subcommittees
 SC/1 - C3 CC SC (C3 Capability Coherence Subcommittee)
 WG/1 C3 Policy
 WG/2 C3 Capabilities
 WG/3 C3 Interoperability
 WG/4 NOSWG (NATO Open Systems Working Group) 
 AHWG/1 Maritime C3
 SC/3 - FMSC (Frequency Management Subcommittee)
 WG/1 Policy
 WG/2 Military Frequency
 WG/3 Technical
 SC/4 - IA SC (Information Assurance Subcommittee)
 AHWG/1 Cross-Domain Issues
 AHWG/2 Technical IA Services
 AHWG/3 Security Management Infrastructure
 AHWG/4 Cryptographic Services
 AHWG/5 Reserved
 SC/5 - IS SC (Information Services Subcommittee)
 WG/1 DataLink
 WG/2 Message Text Formats
 WG/3 DMSWG (Data Management Services Working Group)
 WG/4 XMLSWG (XML Management Services Working Group)
 WG/5 CESWG (Core Enterprise Services Working Group) 
 SC/6 - CNS SC (Communication and Network Services Subcommittee)
 WG/1 Networking
 WG/2 SATCOM
 AHWG/1 BLOS Comms
 AHWG/2 V/UHF Radio
 AHWG/3 Secure Multimedia Conferencing
 SC/7 - IDENT SC (Identification Subcommittee)
 AHWG/4 NATO Mode and Mode S Identification
 AHWG/5 Air To Surface Identification
 SC/8 - NAV SC (Navigation Subcommittee)
 AHWG NAVWAR
 AHWG Precision Positioning Systems Certification

External links 
 NC3O Chapter in the NATO Handbook

NATO agencies
Military research institutes
Command and control